In mathematics, Artin's criteria are a collection of related necessary and sufficient conditions on deformation functors which prove the representability of these functors as either Algebraic spaces or as Algebraic stacks. In particular, these conditions are used in the construction of the moduli stack of elliptic curves and the construction of the moduli stack of pointed curves.

Notation and technical notes 

 For any pair of elements  the fiber product  is represented as an algebraic space
 There is a scheme  locally of finite type, and an element  which is smooth and surjective such that for any  the induced map  is smooth and surjective.

See also 
Artin approximation theorem
Schlessinger's theorem

References

 Deformation theory and algebraic stacks - overview of Artin's papers and related research

Algebraic geometry